Mulkaji was the position of head of executive of Kingdom of Nepal in the late 18th and early 19th centuries. It was equivalent to Prime Minister of Nepal. There were 5 Mulkajis appointed between 1785 and 1804.

Meaning
Mulkaji is formed from two words: Mul and Kaji. Mul means Chief, Key or Fundamental and Kaji is derived from Sanskrit word Karyi which meant functionary. Altogether it means Chief Functionary or Executive Head of the State.

History of the five Mulkajis

Abhiman Singh Basnyat 
Dewan Kaji Bamsa Raj Pande was beheaded on March 1785 on the conspiracy of Queen Rajendra Laxmi with the help of supporters including senior Kaji Swaroop Singh Karki. On 2 July 1785, Prince Regent Bahadur Shah of Nepal was arrested and on the eleventh day of imprisonment on 13 July, Queen Rajendra Laxmi died. Then onwards, Bahadur Shah of Nepal took over the regency of his nephew King Rana Bahadur Shah and the position of Chautariya while Abhiman Singh Basnyat was elected Mulkaji (Chief Kaji).

Kirtiman Singh Basnyat 
In 1794, King Rana Bahadur Shah came of age and appointed Kirtiman Singh Basnyat as Chief (Mul) Kaji among the newly appointed four Kajis though Damodar Pande was the most influential Kaji. Kirtiman had succeeded Abhiman Singh Basnyat as Chief Kaji.

Bakhtawar Singh Basnyat 
Kirtiman was secretly assassinated on 28 September 1801, by the supporters of Raj Rajeshwari Devi and his brother Bakhtawar Singh Basnyat, was then given the post of Chief (Mul) Kaji.

Damodar Pande 
Later Damodar Pande was appointed by Queen Rajrajeshwari as Chief Kaji.

Ranajit Pande 
After the execution of Mulkaji Damodar Pande on March 1804, Ranajit Pande was appointed as Mulkaji (Chief Kaji) along with Bhimsen Thapa as second Kaji, Sher Bahadur Shah as Mul Chautariya and Ranganath Paudel as Raj Guru (Royal Preceptor).

Later King Rana Bahadur Shah created the title of Mukhtiyar and assume full executive power of the state.

List of Mulkajis of Kingdom of Nepal

Controversial Mulkaji
Historian Dilli Raman Regmi asserts that Sarbajit Rana Magar was chosen as  Chief Functionary. Historian Rishikesh Shah asserts that Sarbajit was appointed only a Kaji  and was the head of the Nepalese government for a short period in 1778.

See also
Government of Nepal
History of Nepal

References

Bibliography

 
Government of Nepal
1780s neologisms
Government ministers of Nepal
Positions of authority
Political history of Nepal